The Connecticut was a sailing frigate built by Seth Overton at Chatham, Conn. and launched 6 June 1799 at Middletown, Conn. She sailed 15 Oct. 1799 under the command of Captain M. Tryon for the Guadaloupe Station, and cruised in the West Indies for a year during the Quasi-War with France, protecting American commerce from French privateers. Connecticut's successful career was highlighted by the capture of four privateers and the recapture of seven American merchantmen. Arriving at New London, Conn., 18 Oct. 1800, Connecticut was sold at New York in 1801.

The mensurations are designed by the plan of the Departement of the Navy.

See also
List of sailing frigates of the United States Navy

References

Bibliography

Ships of the United States Navy
Age of Sail naval ships of the United States
1799 ships
Military in Connecticut

Website: https://ussconnecticut1799.com